Mariann Ambrus (later Feketé, 24 April 1956 – 19 October 2007) was a Hungarian rower. She competed in the single sculls at the 1976 and 1980 Summer Olympics. She was born and died in Budapest.

References

External links
 
 
 

1956 births
2007 deaths
Hungarian female rowers
Rowers from Budapest
Olympic rowers of Hungary
Rowers at the 1976 Summer Olympics
Rowers at the 1980 Summer Olympics
World Rowing Championships medalists for Hungary
20th-century Hungarian women
21st-century Hungarian women